The Story of Maryam is the first album by Paul Motian to be released on the Italian Soul Note label. It was released in 1984 and features performances by Motian with guitarist  Bill Frisell, tenor saxophonists Joe Lovano and Jim Pepper, and bassist Ed Schuller.

Reception
The Allmusic review awarded the album 4½ stars.

Track listing
 "9 x 9" - 7:10  
 "5 Miles to Wrentham" - 4:54  
 "The Owl of Cranston" - 8:15  
 "Trieste" - 5:45  
 "Look to the Black Wall" - 6:42  
 "The Story of Maryam" - 5:47

All compositions by Paul Motian
Recorded July 27&28, 1983 Milan, Italy

Personnel
Paul Motian - drums
Bill Frisell - electric guitar
Joe Lovano - tenor saxophone
Jim Pepper - tenor and soprano saxophones
Ed Schuller - bass

References 

1984 albums
Paul Motian albums
Black Saint/Soul Note albums